The Fore River Railroad  is a class III railroad in eastern Massachusetts owned by the Massachusetts Water Resources Authority (MWRA) and operated by the Fore River Transportation Corporation. Originally an integral part of the shipyard, the Fore River Railroad was incorporated as a separate company in 1919 by Bethlehem Steel, which purchased the shipyard itself during World War I.

The railroad continued to serve the shipyard through both World Wars and was bought by General Dynamics in 1963. The new owner ran the shipyard and railroad until 1986, when the shipyard was closed. As local customers still used the railroad, General Dynamics leased train operations to the Colorado Eastern Railroad, before selling the railroad outright to the MWRA the following year. MWRA has used the railroad to transport solid sewage waste (sludge) and fertilizer produced from this sludge. In 1991, the MWRA leased railroad operations to a subsidiary of the New England Southern Railroad; ten years later, the contract was instead given to the Fore River Transportation Corporation, a subsidiary of the line's other significant customer, Twin Rivers Technologies. Twin Rivers uses the railroad to ship fatty acids from a facility at Quincy Point.

The Fore River Railroad connects with CSX Transportation in Braintree, via the Greenbush Line of MBTA Commuter Rail.

History 
The Fore River Railroad was originally formed by Thomas A. Watson, telephone pioneer and assistant to Alexander Graham Bell. Wealthy from his telephone inventions, Watson decided to try his hand at shipbuilding, and purchased land at Quincy Point in Massachusetts and built a shipyard. He won a shipbuilding contract from the United States Navy before the shipyard opened. To supply the shipyard, Watson realized a railroad connection was necessary.

In response, Watson decided to build his own railroad, and a route from the shipyard to the South Shore Railroad line was identified. However, Watson did not charter his railroad, and therefore could not use eminent domain to purchase all of the necessary land; as a result, he "was forced to pay dearly for one parcel needed for the right of way". After the offending property was purchased, construction commenced in 1902, and the first train reached the shipyard in June 1903. The company connected with the New Haven Railroad in East Braintree.

Initially, there was no corporate distinction between the shipyard and the railroad; both were part of the same company. During World War I, the shipyard was purchased by Bethlehem Steel, and saw brisk business constructing warships. A connection was made to the Bay State Street Railway at Quincy Avenue, and electrification added to the north portion of the Fore River Railroad, so shipyard workers could take the streetcar directly to the shipyard. This arrangement lasted until shortly after the conclusion of World War I.

Bethlehem Steel formally created the Fore River Railroad in 1919 as a subsidiary. Traffic was modest post-war, until the start of World War II brought increased demand for warships and more business to the shipyard. Bethlehem introduced diesel locomotives in 1946, and the railroad's steam locomotives were all retired the following year. The shipyard continued until the start of the 1960s, at which point business had sharply declined. Rather than close the shipyard, Bethlehem sold it to General Dynamics in 1963. The new owner obtained more contracts from the Navy and the shipyard was once again busy. This continued until 1986, when the shipyard shut down for good. In 1987, the railroad reported an estimated 1,000 carloads of traffic.

While its primary purpose for existing was gone, the Fore River Railroad continued operating to serve a few local industries; these included a soap manufacturer and an oil facility. No longer needing the railroad, General Dynamics leased its operations to the Colorado and Eastern Railroad after closing the shipyard, and the following year sold both the shipyard and the railroad to the Massachusetts Water Resources Authority (MWRA). The MWRA was interested in the land to support its efforts to clean pollution in Boston Harbor. Conrail took over the railroad's lease in 1988. 

Under the MWRA, the Fore River Railroad began hauling sewage sludge and fertilizer produced from the sludge. In 1991 the MWRA leased operations to a new company, the Quincy Bay Terminal Company, which was a subsidiary of the New England Southern Railroad. Under Quincy Bay Terminal, the railroad began operating over a short segment of the Greenbush Line to connect with Conrail in Braintree. Quincy Bay Terminal operated the line until 2001, when it was replaced by another incarnation of the Fore River Railroad, this time owned by Twin Rivers Technologies, a fatty acids manufacturer served by the railroad. The Fore River Railroad has continued to interchange with Conrail successor CSX Transportation in Braintree.

References

Further reading

External links
 

Massachusetts railroads
Switching and terminal railroads
Fore River Shipyard